Gaspard-Gustave de Coriolis (21 May 1792 – 19 September 1843) was a French mathematician, mechanical engineer and scientist. He is best known for his work on the supplementary forces that are detected in a rotating frame of reference, leading to the Coriolis effect. He was the first to apply the term travail (translated as "work") for the transfer of energy by a force acting through a distance.

Biography

Coriolis was born in Paris in 1792. In 1808 he sat the entrance exam  and was placed second of all the students entering that year, and in 1816, he became a tutor at the École Polytechnique, where he did experiments on friction and hydraulics.

In 1829, Coriolis published a textbook, Calcul de l'Effet des Machines ("Calculation of the Effect of Machines"), which presented mechanics in a way that could readily be applied by industry. In this period, the correct expression for kinetic energy, ½mv2, and its relation to mechanical work, became established.

During the following years, Coriolis worked to extend the notions of kinetic energy and work to rotating systems. The first of his papers, Sur le principe des forces vives dans les mouvements relatifs des machines (On the principle of kinetic energy in the relative motion in machines), was read to the Académie des Sciences (Coriolis 1832). Three years later came the paper that would make his name famous, Sur les équations du mouvement relatif des systèmes de corps (On the equations of relative motion of a system of bodies). Coriolis's papers do not deal with the atmosphere or even the rotation of the Earth, but with the transfer of energy in rotating systems like waterwheels. Coriolis discussed the supplementary forces that are detected in a rotating frame of reference and he divided these forces into two categories. The second category contained the force that would eventually bear his name. A detailed discussion may be found in Dugas.

In 1835, he published a mathematical work on collisions of spheres: Théorie Mathématique des Effets du Jeu de Billard, considered a classic on the subject.

Coriolis's name began to appear in the meteorological literature at the end of the 19th century, although the term "Coriolis force" was not used until the beginning of the 20th century. Today, the name Coriolis has become strongly associated with meteorology, but all major discoveries about the general circulation and the relation between the pressure and wind fields were made without knowledge about Gaspard Gustave Coriolis.

Coriolis became professor of mechanics at the École Centrale des Arts et Manufactures in 1829. Upon the death of Claude-Louis Navier in 1836, Coriolis succeeded him in the chair of applied mechanics at the École Nationale des Ponts et Chaussées and to Navier's place in the Académie des Sciences. In 1838, he succeeded Dulong as Directeur des études (director of studies) in the École Polytechnique.

He died in 1843 at the age of 51 in Paris.  His name is one of the 72 names inscribed on the Eiffel Tower.

See also
Catenary

References

Further reading
 Persson, A., 1998 How do we understand the Coriolis Force? Bull. Amer. Meteor. Soc. 79, 1373–1385. 374 KB PDF document of the above article

External links
 
 "Sur les équations du mouvement relatif des systèmes de corps" (Coriolis, 1831 & 1835), online and analyzed on BibNum [click 'à télécharger' for English version]
 "Sur le bruit du tonnerre" (Coriolis, 1833), online and analyzed on BibNum [click 'à télécharger' for English version]

French civil engineers
École Polytechnique alumni
École des Ponts ParisTech alumni
Corps des ponts
1792 births
1843 deaths
Scientists from Paris
19th-century French mathematicians
French physicists
French mechanical engineers
Members of the French Academy of Sciences
Burials at Montparnasse Cemetery